Wang Huo (born 1 July 1924) is a Chinese novelist and screenwriter. Wang was a member of the 5th, 6th National Committee of the Chinese People's Political Consultative Conference.

Biography
Wang was born in Shanghai in July 1924, with his ancestral home in Rudong County, Jiangsu.

Wang started to publish works in 1943.

Wang joined the National Literature and Art Association in 1948. At the same year, he graduated from Fudan University. After graduation, Wang worked in Shanghai Federation of Trade Unions.  He is a member of the Chinese Communist Party.

After the founding of the Communist State, Wang worked in Laodong Publishing House as an editor.

In 1953, Wang was transferred to All-China Federation of Trade Unions, he served as the chief editor of Chinese Worker.

In 1961, Wang taught at a school in Linyi, Shandong.

Wang joined the China Writers Association in 1979.

In 1983, Wang was appointed an associate editor of Sichuan People's Publishing House and the chief editor of Sichuan Literature and Art Publishing House.

Wang retired in 1987.

Works

Novellas
 Right of Privacy

Long-gestating novels
 War and People
 The Foreign Eighth Route Army
 The Biography of Jie Zhenguo
 Firelight in the Heavy Fog
 Xueji
 The Biography of Firefly
 Awakening to Truth

Short stories
 Meteor
 The General Strike

Proses and poems
 Xichuangzhu

Screenplay
 The Moon and the Sea
 The Foreign Eighth Route Army

Awards
 War and People – 4th Mao Dun Literature Prize (1997)

References

1924 births
Fudan University alumni
Short story writers from Shanghai
Living people
Republic of China novelists
Chinese male short story writers
Chinese dramatists and playwrights
Chinese Communist Party politicians from Shanghai
People's Republic of China politicians from Shanghai
Mao Dun Literature Prize laureates
Chinese male novelists
People's Republic of China short story writers